Platytomus is a genus of aphodiine dung beetles in the family Scarabaeidae. There are more than 20 described species in Platytomus.

Species
These 26 species belong to the genus Platytomus:

  Platytomus antipodum  (Fauvel, 1903)
  Platytomus ashantii  (Endrödi, 1973)
  Platytomus atlanticus  (Cartwright, 1948)
  Platytomus caelicollis  (Cartwright, 1948)
  Platytomus darwini  (Cartwright, 1970)
  Platytomus freudei  (Balthasar, 1960)
  Platytomus gomyi  Pittino & Mariani, 1986
  Platytomus gregalis  (Cartwright, 1948)
  Platytomus grisoli  (Paulian, 1942)
  Platytomus hawaiiensis  (Rakovic, 1981)
  Platytomus indicus  (Balthasar, 1941)
  Platytomus jailensis  (Apostolov & Maltzev, 1986)
  Platytomus laevistriatus  (Perris, 1869)
  Platytomus longulus  (Cartwright, 1948)
  Platytomus micros  (Bates, 1887)
  Platytomus mongolicus  (Medvedev, 1974)
  Platytomus nagporensis  Pittino & Mariani, 1986
  Platytomus nathani  Pittino & Mariani, 1986
  Platytomus notialis  (Cartwright, 1948)
  Platytomus obscurior  (Blackburn, 1904)
  Platytomus pachypus  (Lea, 1923)
  Platytomus parvulus  (Chevrolat, 1864)
  Platytomus pumilio  (Balthasar, 1966)
  Platytomus tibialis  (Fabricius, 1798)
  Platytomus variolosus  (Kolenati, 1846)
  Platytomus yadai  (Ochi, Kawahara & Inagaki, 2006)

References

Further reading

External links

 

Scarabaeidae
Articles created by Qbugbot